Vila de Gràcia, also known as Gràcia, is a neighborhood in the Gràcia district of Barcelona, Catalonia (Spain). This neighborhood was the main core of the old town of Gràcia that included also Camp d'en Grassot i Gràcia Nova.

External links
 

Neighbourhoods of Barcelona
Gràcia